DMPA can refer to:

 Depot medroxyprogesterone acetate, a birth control medication marketed under the brand name Depo-Provera
 2,2-Dimethoxy-2-phenylacetophenone, a radical initiator
 N,N′-Dimethyl-1,3-propanediamine, a cross linking reagent
 Dimethylol propionic acid
 Des Moines Performing Arts, the organization that operates the Civic Center of Greater Des Moines
 Diploma in Medical Practisonal Aelopathy